William F. Sullivan (March 12, 1864 – September 27, 1911) was a professional baseball player. He appeared in one game in Major League Baseball for the St. Louis Maroons of the Union Association in 1884.

External links

Major League Baseball pitchers
St. Louis Maroons players
Baseball players from St. Louis
19th-century baseball players
1864 births
1911 deaths